The orange tundra is a cocktail of vodka, Kahlúa, creme soda, and orange juice. It is traditionally poured over 2 to 3 cubes of ice in an old fashioned glass.

Origin

This mixed drink became popular in the early 2000s. This drink's name is largely attributed to its cold serving temperature and orange appearance from the use of orange juice.

Typical recipe

25ml Vodka
25ml Cream soda
25ml Kahlua (or coffee liqueur)              
25ml Orange juice

The ingredients are added to the highball glass in the following order: vodka, cream soda, coffee liqueur and finally, orange juice. Although ice can be added, the drink should not be stirred before serving.

See also

 List of cocktails

Cocktails with vodka
Cocktails with coffee liqueur